St John the Baptist Church is located to the northeast of the village of Tunstall, Lancashire, England. It is an active Anglican parish church in the united benefice of East Lonsdale, in the deanery of Tunstall, the archdeaconry of Lancaster and the diocese of Blackburn. The benefice of East Lonsdale combines this church with St Peter, Leck, St Wilfrid, Melling, St James the Less, Tatham, The Good Shepherd, Lowgill, and Holy Trinity, Wray. The church is recorded in the National Heritage List for England as a designated Grade I listed building. Services are usually at 11:00 on 2nd & 4th Sundays, in rota with the sister church at Leck.

History

A church at Tunstall is recorded in the Domesday survey but the oldest structure in the present church dates from the 13th century. The church was rebuilt around 1415 by Sir Thomas Tunstal. Alterations were made to the church in the 16th century. In the 1820s it was attended by the Brontë sisters during the time they were receiving education at the Clergy Daughters' School at nearby Cowan Bridge. In 1907 the church was restored by the Lancaster architects Austin and Paley; this included re-roofing the church, enlarging the organ chamber, and adding a vestry, at a cost of about £1,000.

Architecture

Exterior
The church is built in sandstone rubble with a slate roof. Its plan consists of a west tower, a nave and chancel under a continuous roof, north and south aisles, and a two-storey south porch. The tower has diagonal buttresses and an embattled parapet. Above each of the small bell openings is a carved tablet of an angel holding a shield. The west door has a pointed head above which is a three-light window with Perpendicular tracery. The aisles have embattled parapets, as does the porch. Above the door of the porch is a niche with a sundial plate and above that a small one-light window.

Interior
Internally the responds of the north arcade have early 13th-century capitals and the west lancet windows of the north aisle are probably also from this century. Dating from the 1907 restoration are the roof, and the chancel screen. A Roman votive stone, thought to be linked to Over Burrow Roman Fort, has been built into the surround of a window in the north aisle. At the east end of the south aisle is a chapel known as the Chapel of the Holy Trinity. In the chapel is a mutilated effigy which is said to be of Sir Thomas Tunstal. Under the tower arch is an 18th-century oval marble font on sandstone baluster base. The east window contains glass from the Netherlands dating from the late 15th and the 16th centuries. It was donated to the church in 1810 by Richard Toulmin North of nearby Thurland Castle. In the south wall is stained glass dated 1979 by Jane Gray. In the church are a number of memorials to the Fenwick family. The two-manual organ was built in 1923 by Harrison and Harrison.

The church also owns a 16th-century painting by Francesco Montemezzano. It was probably donated to the church in the early 19th century by Frederick Needham (the church's vicar from 1810 to 1816), who was a half-brother of the church's patron, Richard Toulmin North of Thurland Castle. The painting was removed for restoration in connection with a BBC television programme discussed below. The painting is now back in the church and can be visited any time the church is open, usually 09:30 – 16:00 seven days a week. There is information about the painting, and copies of it for sale, in the church.

External features

Near the church there is a sandstone sundial base dating probably from the 18th century consisting of a round column with a square cap on a base of three octagonal steps. It is listed at Grade II. The churchyard also contains the war graves of four service personnel of World War II.

In media

The church was featured in an episode of the BBC One television series Fake or Fortune? that aired on 19 July 2015 (Series 4, Episode 3). The identity of the artist who created the church's 16th-century painting of the Lamentation of Christ had been a mystery, but an investigation of the painting and its history revealed that it was a work by Venetian artist Francesco Montemezzano. The painting is believed to have left Venice after the fall of the Venetian Republic in 1797, when systematic looting of art took place.

See also

Grade I listed buildings in Lancashire
Grade I listed churches in Lancashire
Listed buildings in Tunstall, Lancashire

References

External links
Stained glass
The parish of Tunstall at British History Online

For more information, see our Facebook page:  " Tunstall Church Trust, Lunesdale " and https://eastlonsdalebenefice.wordpress.com .  The bi-monthly parish magazine, "The Bell' is available on this site, and in any of the six churches.  

Churches completed in 1450
15th-century church buildings in England
Church of England church buildings in Lancashire
Grade I listed churches in Lancashire
English Gothic architecture in Lancashire
Churches in the City of Lancaster
Austin and Paley buildings
Diocese of Blackburn
1450 establishments in England